Bianca Desai or Biyanka Desai is an Indian actress who has starred in predominantly Kannada and Telugu films.

Career
Bianca Desai has been part of more than 9 films in Kannada.

Filmography

See also

List of people from Karnataka
Cinema of Karnataka
List of Indian actresses
Cinema of India

References

Actresses in Kannada cinema
Actresses in Tamil cinema
Living people
Kannada people
Actresses from Karnataka
Indian film actresses
21st-century Indian actresses
Actresses in Kannada television
Year of birth missing (living people)